Maximilian Gustav Alfred Cecil Michaelis (born: 19 August 1913 - died: 3 May 1997), was an artist who also practised in glass and ceramics, and a philanthropist who encouraged crafts and design. He was the only son of Sir Max Michaelis, a South African randlord.

Early life and education
Cecil Michaelis was born in Cabourg, France, in 1913, the son of Sir Max Michaelis, a British citizen of German-Jewish extraction who was a self-made Randlord in South Africa, and Lady Lillian Elizabeth Michaelis (?-1969, London). He studied at the Ruskin School of Drawing and Fine Art in Oxford, and then moved to Paris where he studied under Henri Dimier and Othon Friesz, and was advised by Georges Rouault and André Derain.

Career
Although his family wealth precluded a formal career, Michaelis worked tirelessly at his art, drawing and sculpture whilst dividing his time between France, South Africa and Great Britain.  In 1935 Sir Max Michaelis purchased Rycote Park near Thame in Oxfordshire, for Cecil's use while he was studying at the Ruskin School of Drawing and Fine Art in Oxford. It remained one of his residences until his death.

Teapots
One of Michaelis' specialities was making teapots, most especially with anti-drip spouts. Whilst serving in the British Army in Sicily he was renowned for both making and teaching the manufacture of teapots.

Exhibitions
His work was exhibited widely from 1940 to 1980 in Paris, New York and London.

Rycotewood College
In the late 1930s his philanthropy established Rycotewood College in the nearby town of Thame as a school dedicated to developing skilled craftsmen. In 2003 it merged with Oxford City College and the Rycote Furniture Centre courses were moved to Oxpens road.

Montebello Design Centre 
In 1988 he donated part of his Cape Town estate to the University of Cape Town so as to setup the Montebello Design Center.

References

External links
Montebello Design Centre

1913 births
1997 deaths
People from Cabourg
South African mining businesspeople
South African sculptors
Newlands, Cape Town
Alumni of the Ruskin School of Art